Viorel Vasile Ignătescu (born 1 January 1977) is a Romanian former footballer who played as a goalkeeper mainly for FCM Bacău, but also for teams such as Politehnica Timișoara or SC Bacău. After retirement he was the goalkeeping coach of SC Bacău, then in 2016 moved to England where he works as a driver.

Honours
FCM Bacău
Cupa Ligii: 1998

References

External links

1977 births
Living people
Sportspeople from Bacău
Romanian footballers
Association football goalkeepers
Liga I players
Liga II players
FCM Bacău players
FC Politehnica Timișoara players